Alan Norman Connolly (born 29 June 1939, Skipton, Victoria) is a former Australian cricketer who played in 29 Tests and one ODI from 1963 to 1971.

Connolly was a fast bowler early in his career, but slowed his pace to increase his accuracy and became a reliable support bowler in partnership with Garth McKenzie. He was instrumental in Australia's 159-run victory at Old Trafford in 1968, the only time England lost a match in a sequence of 40 Tests between 1966 and 1971. He headed Australia's bowling figures for the series, with 23 wickets at 21.34. He played the 1969 and 1970 seasons for Middlesex.

On the tour of South Africa in 1969-70 he took 20 wickets at 26.10, in a series in which Australia lost all four Tests, and his four fellow pace bowlers took only 17 wickets between them at a combined average of 61.70.

He was recalled for his last Test match in the Fourth Test at Sydney in the 1970-71 Ashes series, but was dropped after taking just one wicket in Australia's 299-run loss. He retired from first-class cricket at the end of the season.

See also
 List of Victoria first-class cricketers

References

External links
Cricinfo article on Alan Connolly
Cricket Archive on Alan Connolly

1939 births
Living people
Australia One Day International cricketers
Australia Test cricketers
Middlesex cricketers
Victoria cricketers
Australian cricketers
Cricketers from Victoria (Australia)